Central Register of Monuments, abbreviated CES is the only record of memorials in Bosnia and Herzegovina and Croatia, which were built in the post-conflict period in Bosnia and Herzegovina (1996 – 2016) and Croatia (1996-2017). 

Central Register of Monuments is managed and regulated by the UDIK. It is a part of the UDIK's program for the countries of the former Yugoslavia

References

External links
 UDIK Sarajevo
 Central register of monuments
 U Sarajevu predstavljanje Centralne evidencije spomenika u BiH
 U BiH izgrađeno više od 2100 spomenika posvećenih ratu 1992-1995
 Mostar: Armiji BiH 48, HVO-u 16 spomenika

 
 
 
 
Heritage registers in Bosnia and Herzegovina